Pete Stewart is a singer, guitarist, songwriter and producer from Seattle, Washington. He is the lead singer and guitarist of Grammatrain, was the lead singer for The Accident Experiment, and is the former guitarist of Tait.

Stewart released solo albums in 1999, 2007 and 2010. He served as producer, songwriter, and guitarist for the debut albums of Tait (the solo project of Michael Tait) and TobyMac, the latter of which sold over 500,000 copies.

Awards
2013 Grammy Award: Best Rap Album – Macklemore & Ryan Lewis: The Heist (Engineer/Mixer)
2009 Grammy Award: Best Rock/Rap Gospel Album – TobyMac: Alive and Transported (Songwriter)
2005 Dove Award: Special Event Album – !Hero: The Rock Opera (Producer/Songwriter)
2003 San Diego Music Award: Best New Rock Artist – The Accident Experiment (Producer/Songwriter/Vocalist)
2002 Dove Award: Best Rap/HipHop Album – TobyMac: Momentum (Producer/Songwriter)
2002 Grammy Award: Best Gospel Rock Album – dcTalk: Solo (Producer/Songwriter)

Discography

with Grammatrain
 Grammatrain – 1995
 Lonely House – 1995
 Flying – 1997
 Live – 1999
 Kneeling Between Shields EP – 2009
 Imperium – 2010

Solo recordings
 Pete Stewart – 1999
 I Gave You a Desert – 2007
 Under North Sky – 2010

with The Accident Experiment
 Arena EP – 2003
 Mind Death Machine maxi single – 2005
 United We Fear – released Independently in 2005, then signed to Rock Ridge which re-released it in 2006

with Tait
 Empty – 2001

Album credits

Producer
DC Talk – Solo (Virgin Records/EMI) – 2002 Grammy for Best Gospel Rock Album
TobyMac – Momentum (ForeFront Records/EMI) – RIAA Gold Sales Award, 2002 Dove Award for Best Rap/HipHop Album
Tait – Empty (ForeFront Records/EMI)
Sanctus Real – Say It Loud (Sparrow Records/EMI)
Peace of Mind – Peace of Mind (BEC Recordings/EMI)
Write This Down – "Lost Weekend" (Tooth & Nail Records/EMI)
!Hero: The Rock Opera (Meaux Music) – 2005 Dove Award for Special Event Album of the Year
Bleach – Bleach (ForeFront Records/EMI)
Whitney Mongé – Steadfast (independent)
Rex Lex – Rex Lex (independent)
Corrin Campbell – "Gilded" (independent)

See also

Grammatrain

References

External links
Pete Stewart at MySpace

Living people
Musicians from Seattle
American male guitarists
Year of birth missing (living people)